The Hong Kong Film Archive is a film archive collects, preserves, and screens Hong Kong films and other related materials. The archive was founded in 1993, when its Planning Office was opened by the Urban Council. It joined the International Federation of Film Archives in 1996. The archive has been under the management of the Leisure and Cultural Services Department since 2000.

The film archive building in Sai Wan Ho regularly hosts exhibitions, screenings and seminars showcasing Hong Kong film.

The archive edits the book series Hong Kong Filmography and Monographs of Hong Kong Film Veterans. It also distributes a quarterly Newsletter that reports on the latest developments of the Archive and includes features on certain aspects of film culture.

Collection
On 17 November 2011, TVB handed over about 1,000 film titles from the 1930s to the 1990s to the Hong Kong Film Archive (HKFA) for permanent preservation. About 600 film titles, including 27 Chaozhou and Amoy dialect films, are new to the HKFA's collection. 

Films to be handed over include the earliest Chinese film in TVB's library, Little Heroine (1939), starring Hu Rongrong and Kung Chiu-hsia; and the earliest Hong Kong film in the library, Female Spy 76 (1947) starring Wu Lai-chu and Wang Hao. The eight films on the list of HKFA's recommended "100 Must-See Hong Kong Movies" are: Wong Fei-hung's Whip that Smacks the Candle (1949), Wong Fei-hung Burns the Tyrants' Lair (1949), "Blood-stained Azaleas" (1951), Mysterious Murderer (1951) parts one and two, Butterfly and Red Pear Blossom (1959), Father Is Back (1961) and The Pregnant Maiden (1968).

Facility
The archive is housed in a five-story building at 50 Lei King Road, Sai Wan Ho, which opened on 3 January 2001. Public screenings of archive holdings are routinely held in the 125-seat cinema housed within. The regular ticket price is $40, with concessionary pricing available for students, seniors, and the disabled.

Floorplan
 Basement: Carpark and Plants Rooms (not open to the public)
 G/F: Box Office, Exhibition Hall
 M/F: Machine and Air-conditioning Plants Rooms (not open to the public)
 1/F: Film Store and Cinema
 2/F: Film Projection Room, Film Store and Cinema (entrance on 1/F)
 3/F: Resource Centre, Staff Office and Film Store
 4/F: Admin. Office, Film Related Material Store
 5/F: Roof (scheduled for expansion)

Only the Box Office, Exhibition Hall and Resource Centre are public access facilities.

Transportation
The archive building is approximately a five-minute walk from Exit A of Sai Wan Ho MTR station.

References

External links

 
Hong Kong Film Archive Database

Museums in Hong Kong
Film archives in Asia
Sai Wan Ho
Cinema museums in China
1993 establishments in Hong Kong
FIAF-affiliated institutions